Palustris Experimental Forest is an experimental forest operated by the Southern Research Station (SRS) of the United States Forest Service in Rapides Parish, Louisiana. It is located south of Alexandria, Louisiana within the Kisatchie National Forest. The experimental forest bears the name of the predominant pine species (Pinus palustris) that covered this region before the virgin pine forests were harvested in the early 1900s.

History

At the end of the 19th century, the longleaf pine ecosystem covered millions of acres across the southeastern US, from Virginia to Texas. In the early 1900s, aggressive harvesting of these old-growth pine forests resulted in a barren landscape in need of reforestation. Under federal programs such as the Weeks Act and Clarke-McNary Act, the US government began buying thousands of cutover acres in Louisiana and other southeastern states to create National Forests with the goal of rehabilitating these former old-growth forests.

Palustris Experimental Forest

The experimental forest was to serve as a field laboratory for evaluating pine reforestation techniques.

J.K. Johnson Tract
In 1950, the original portion of the Palustris Experimental Forest was designated the J.K. Johnson Tract – located at  – in honor of the Great Southern Lumber Company's chief forester who was an early advocate of reforestation in the South.

Research on the J.K. Johnson Tract has included:
 Collection, processing and storage of pine cones and seeds 
 Development of techniques for pine seedling production in nurseries for outplanting of southern pines
 Development of techniques to control brown-spot needle blight (Mycosphaerella dearnessii) in longleaf pine seedlings 
 Assess intensive management – prescribed burning, pruning, & thinning – in established pine stands to increase productivity
 Assess global climate change on forest productivity

Longleaf Tract 
In the 1950s, a separate  Longleaf Tract – located at  – was added to the Palustris Experimental Forest to provide research opportunities in large-scale studies:
 Direct seeding of repellant-treated pine seeds to quickly reforest barren landscapes
 Collection of long-term growth data from established longleaf, loblolly (Pinus taeda), and slash (Pinus elliottii) pines for use in growth & yield modeling
 Control of woody-plant competition to improve pine establishment
 Evaluate interactions of cattle grazing, wildlife management, and timber production
 Evaluate effects of forest management practices – timber harvesting, prescribed burning & site preparation – on long-term soil productivity

References

External links
 Location map of Palustris Experimental Forest within the Calcasieu Ranger District, Kisatchie National Forest

United States Forest Service protected areas
Research forests
Protected areas of Rapides Parish, Louisiana
National Forests of Louisiana
1935 establishments in Louisiana